Qurate Retail Group (commonly known as Qurate Retail, Inc.) is an American media conglomerate controlled by company chairman John C. Malone, who owns a majority of the voting shares.

History

1998 launch by Liberty Media

Liberty Interactive was originally a division of Liberty Media. On September 28, 1998, Liberty Media announced the formation of Liberty Interactive. This new division would take advantage of emerging technologies such as set-top boxes to develop interactive programming. The company owned 86% of TCI Music Inc. (NASDAQ symbol: TUNE/TUNEP). As of January 1, 1999, E! President and Chief Executive Officer Lee Masters would become the new company's CEO, and Bruce Ravenel would be Chief Technology Officer.

On September 10, 1999, Liberty Media Group renamed TCI Music to Liberty Digital Inc. (NASDAQ symbol: LDIG), with the new company trading on NASDAQ's National Market tier, after Liberty Media traded most of its Internet content, interactive television assets, and rights to provide AT&T's cable systems with interactive services, plus cash and notes valued at $150 million, for TCI Music stock. Masters, who became Liberty Digital's CEO, told The Wall Street Journal that the new company had a value of $1 billion, $650 million of that from the interactive unit of Liberty Media, which had also used the name Liberty Digital. Liberty Digital lost $244 million with revenue of $66 million in 1999, thanks to investments in struggling Internet businesses HomeGrocer, drugstore.com, TiVo Corporation , and iVillage. The company bought half of the Game Show Network because of its interactive features.

On December 17, 1999, TCI Satellite Entertainment Inc. (TSAT), based in Englewood, Colorado, announced that Liberty Media was trading its interest in Sprint PCS for $300 million in TCI Satellite preferred stock. A new company, ninety percent owned by Liberty Media and ten percent owned by TCI Satellite, would combine the satellite-related businesses and take advantage of the growing area of Internet content.

Spin offs 
In 2004, IAC/Interactive announced the spin off of its travel site Expedia into the new company Expedia. Barry Diller remained the head of IAC/Interactive and the Chairman of Expedia, a move that was completed in 2005.

In November 2007, IAC/InterActiveCorp, then valued at US$18 billion, announced four major spin offs : HSN, Ticketmaster, Interval (vacation and time-share business) and LendingTree. All spun off companies became publicly-traded. IAC retained most of its emerging internet businesses: Ask.com, Evite, Match.com, Vimeo, Citysearch and Zwinky. All spun off units remained headed by Barry Diller.

In 2010, Liberty Media announced that it would spin off Liberty Starz and Liberty Capital and keep Liberty Interactive.

In October 2014, Liberty Interactive spun off BuySeasons and its stake in TripAdvisor into a new company, Liberty TripAdvisor Holdings.

In 2015, Liberty Interactive announced it would spin off CommerceHub as a separate company and its interests in Expedia and Bodybuilding.com into a new company, Liberty Expedia Holdings.

2010s sales and acquisitions 
In July 2014, Liberty Interactive announced it would be selling Provide Commerce (parent of ProFlowers) to FTD in return for an equity stake in FTD.

In October 2014, Liberty Interactive announced its board had approved the division of the firm into two trading stocks – one for its shopping business, QVC Group, and another for its digital commerce, Liberty Digital Commerce, which would trade as Liberty Ventures Group.

In April 2017, Liberty Interactive announced it would acquire Alaskan cable company GCI. On July 6, 2017, Liberty Interactive announced that it would purchase the remaining 62% of HSN stock that it didn't already own, in a $2.1 billion all-stock deal at $40.36 a share.

In July 2017, Liberty Interactive announced that later that year it would spin off its "cable holdings and other non-retail assets" into the new company Liberty Ventures, with Liberty Interactive to be renamed QVC Group. QVC Group would consist of QVC, HSN, Cornerstone Brands, and Zulily.

On March 1, 2018, Liberty Interactive Corporation announced that it would rename itself to Qurate Retail Group.

In July 2021, Qurate Retail announced that former president and CEO Mike George would be replaced by David Rawlinson II on October 1 of the same year.

Activities
Qurate Retail Group: QVC, Inc., Zulily, HSN, Cornerstone Brands
Liberty Ventures: www.ebaby.com
Interests in: Brit + Co, FTD, giggle, ILG, Liberty Broadband, LendingTree, Quid

See also
 List of Colorado companies

References

External links

American companies established in 1998
Mass media companies of the United States
Conglomerate companies of the United States
Holding companies of the United States
Companies based in Colorado
Douglas County, Colorado
Mass media companies established in 1998
Holding companies established in 1998
Companies listed on the Nasdaq
Corporate spin-offs
Liberty Media subsidiaries